Lysinibacillus mangiferihumi is a Gram-positive bacterium from the genus of Lysinibacillus.

References

Bacillaceae
Bacteria described in 2012